Salmagundi is a salad dish that originated in England.  

Salmagundi (meaning "a hodgepodge") may also refer to:
Salmagundi (magazine), a quarterly periodical of the Humanities and Social Sciences
Salmagundi (periodical), a 19th-century satirical periodical 
Salmagundi is the title of the Colgate University yearbook
Salmagundy is the title of the school newspaper at Miss Porter's School, Connecticut.
Salmagundi Club, an art club in New York City

See also
Solomon Grundy (disambiguation)
Solomon Gundy